The Climb is a 2002 film directed by John Schmidt, distributed by World Wide Pictures.

Plot summary
This is a Christian film about two rock climbers, who meet each other during a rescue get a chance to realize a climb of a lifetime, but with an unexpected change: they have to work together. It is a special team, with totally different people, who have different life goals, different views, but use the same climbing technique. It is action filled, but also heart touching film about egoism, responsibility and forgiveness. Derrick (Jason George) is a very selfish person who wants to do the big climbing solo, and Michael (Ned Vaughn) who is a Christian person with a good heart.

References

External links

 
Dean River Productions

2002 films
Mountaineering films
American independent films
2002 drama films
Films about evangelicalism
2002 independent films
American drama films
2000s English-language films
2000s American films